Mir Muhammad Yousaf Badini is a Pakistani politician who is currently a member of Senate of Pakistan.He is the Chairman of Senate Standing Committee on Privatization currently. He was born in Noshki, Balochistan.

Education
He received BA degree from Balochistan University.

Political career
He was elected to Senate of Pakistan in 2013 .He was re-elected to the Senate of Pakistan as an independent candidate in 2015 Pakistani Senate election.

References

Living people
Pakistani senators (14th Parliament)
Year of birth missing (living people)